Nicolas Nadeau (born September 30, 1997) is a Canadian competitive figure skater. As a singles skater, he is the 2016 World Junior silver medallist and the 2015 Canadian national junior champion.

Personal life 
Nadeau was born on September 30, 1997, in Montreal, Quebec. He has three older sisters – Tania, Pamela, and Mélissa. He enjoys skiing in addition to figure skating.

Career

Early years 
Nadeau began learning to skate in 2003. He has been coached by Yvan Desjardins since the summer 2004. 

Competing on the junior level, Nadeau placed sixth at the 2013 Canadian Championships and fourth in 2014.

2014–2015 season 
Nadeau made his international debut in the 2014–2015 season, being selected to compete on the ISU Junior Grand Prix (JGP) series. He placed fifth at his first JGP event, in Aichi, Japan, and tenth in Zagreb, Croatia. He became the national junior champion at the 2015 Canadian Championships in Kingston, Ontario. This earned him a berth to the 2015 World Junior Championships in Tallinn, Estonia, but he missed qualifying for the free skate by one spot, having placed 25th in the short program.

2015–2016 season 
In 2015–2016, Nadeau started his season at the JGP in Riga, Latvia; he finished fifth after placing second in the short program and seventh in the free skate. He won the silver medal at his second JGP event, in Zagreb, Croatia, finishing 0.38 points behind the gold medallist, Alexander Samarin.

In January 2016, Nadeau placed fifth on the senior level at the 2016 Canadian Nationals and was given Canada's sole spot in men's singles at the 2016 World Junior Championships in Debrecen, Hungary. Competing in March at Junior Worlds, he qualified for the final segment by placing eighth in the short program and second in the free skate, winning the silver medal overall.

2016–2017 season 
Nadeau withdrew from his JGP assignments due to an ankle injury, which occurred while practising a quad toe loop jump and took about three months to heal. He returned to competition at the 2016 CS Golden Spin of Zagreb, his first senior international, and finished 11th. At the 2017 Canadian Championships, he placed fifth in the short program, third in the free skate, and fourth overall.

2017–2018 season 
Nadeau began his season at the 2017 Nepela Trophy, where he placed sixth.  He then made his debut appearance on the senior Grand Prix at the 2017 Skate Canada International, where he placed seventh.  He placed ninth at the 2018 Canadian Championships.

2018–2019 season 
Beginning the season at the 2018 Finlandia Trophy, Nadeau placed fourth, less than four points behind from bronze medallist Morisi Kvitelashvili. Nadeau said that he needed to work on executing the one quadruple jump in his free skate.  He subsequently competed in the short program at his lone Grand Prix assignment for the year, the 2018 Internationaux de France, but withdrew for medical reasons.

At the 2019 Canadian Championships, Nadeau placed seventh in the short program after singling his triple Axel attempt and receiving a negative Grade of Execution on his quadruple toe loop.  He rallied in the free skate, where he placed fourth and moved up to sixth place overall. While he finished sixth overall, three of the skaters who finished ahead of him (Stephen Gogolev, Joseph Phan and Conrad Orzel) were ineligible to compete as seniors due to either their age or a lack of the required minimum technical scores, and consequently, Nadeau was named to Canada's team for the 2019 Four Continents Championships, when he finished eleventh.

2019–2020 season 
After withdrawing from the 2019 CS U.S. Classic, Nadeau competed on the Grand Prix at the 2019 Skate Canada International.  Eighth in the short program with a clean skate, but for a problematic landing on his triple loop, he rose to seventh overall after a sixth-place free skate.  He was seventh as well at the 2019 Internationaux de France.

Nadeau placed fifth at the 2020 Canadian Championships.

2020–2021 season 
Nadeau was assigned to compete at the 2020 Skate Canada International, but the event was cancelled as a result of the coronavirus pandemic.

With the pandemic continuing to make it difficult to hold in-person events, the 2021 Skate Canada Challenge was held virtually, and Nadeau placed sixth. The 2021 Canadian Championships were cancelled.

On August 25, 2021, Nadeau announced that he would be retiring from singles skating to take up pair skating with partner Emma Proft.

Skating technique 
Unlike most skaters, Nadeau jumps and spins clockwise.

Programs

With Proft

Single Skating

Competitive highlights

Pairs with Proft

Singles career 
GP: Grand Prix; CS: Challenger Series; JGP: Junior Grand Prix

Detailed results

Singles career

Senior level

Small medals for short and free programs awarded only at ISU Championships.

References

External links 
 

1997 births
Canadian male single skaters
Canadian male pair skaters
Living people
People from Boisbriand
Figure skaters from Montreal
World Junior Figure Skating Championships medalists
20th-century Canadian people
21st-century Canadian people